Eupithecia vicksburgi is a moth in the family Geometridae first described by Frederick H. Rindge in 1985. It is found in the US state of Mississippi.

The length of the forewings is 8.5-9.5 mm for males and 7.5–8 mm for females. The forewings are gray with numerous brown scales. The hindwings are concolorous with the forewings. Adults are on wing from March to April and again from September to October.

Etymology
The specific name is based on the type locality.

References

Moths described in 1985
vicksburgi
Moths of North America